Endemol Shine Group B.V. (stylized in all spaceless) was a Dutch production and distribution company of scripted and non-scripted content, responsible for programmes such as Big Brother, Deal or No Deal, The Money Drop, Fear Factor, MasterChef, Your Face Sounds Familiar, Peaky Blinders, Black Mirror, Humans, Grantchester and Tin Star.

In 2018, Endemol Shine Group had 700 productions on air across 270 platforms and channels. K7 Media report's Tracking the Giants: Top 100 Travelling TV Formats 2018-19 also recognized Endemol Shine Group as the production and distribution company with the most travelled formats in 2018.

Formed in 2015 through a merger of Dutch television studio Endemol and Elisabeth Murdoch's UK-based studio Shine Group, Endemol Shine Group companies included Dragonfly, Kudos, and Princess Productions. It also included Shine TV which was founded in 2001 by Elisabeth Murdoch; and Metronome Film & Television, a Scandinavian-based production group. EndemolShine International was the group's international distribution arm responsible for the distribution of the various formats of the group. The group also established international companies Endemol Shine North America, Endemol Shine Australia, Endemol Shine India, Endemol Shine Germany, Endemol Shine France, and Endemol Shine Iberia.

From 20 March 2019 to 3 July 2020, it was jointly owned by The Walt Disney Company and Apollo Global Management, with each holding a 50% share. On 22 October 2019, French company Banijay announced its intent to acquire Endemol Shine from Disney and Apollo. On 30 June 2020, the European Commission approved Banijay's purchase of Endemol Shine. The purchase was completed on 3 July 2020.

History

Merger of Endemol, Shine Group, CORE Media Group
On 15 May 2014, Apollo Global Management and 21st Century Fox confirmed its intent to form a joint venture with funds managed by affiliates of Apollo, Endemol, Shine Group and CORE Media Group. Under the agreement, 21st Century Fox and the funds managed by affiliates of Apollo would jointly own and manage the new joint venture.

On 10 October 2014, 21st Century Fox and funds managed by affiliates of Apollo announced a final agreement to create the group consists of Endemol, Shine Group and CORE Media. Under the terms of the agreement, 21st Century Fox and Apollo will jointly manage the newly created group, with each owning 50 per cent. Sophie Turner Laing, former Managing Director of Content at BSkyB, would serve as the group's CEO.

On 27 October 2014, Shine Group announced Tim Hincks would become the president of the new joint venture.

On 29 October 2014, Endemol announced Cris Abrego and Charlie Corwin will serve as the new joint venture's North America division Co-Chairmen and Co-CEOs.

On 17 December 2014, 21st Century Fox and funds managed by affiliates of Apollo Global Management, LLC announced the completion of the transaction to create the group consists of Endemol, Shine Group and CORE Media, under the previously announced terms. The joint venture name 'Endemol Shine Group' was announced by Shine Group on the same day. Both Apollo and 21st Century Fox owning 50% of the joint venture that took place on 1 January 2015.

On 15 January 2015, Endemol Shine Group announced appointing former Endemol UK CEO Lucas Church to be Chairman of Endemol Shine UK, former Endemol UK Chief Operating Officer  Richard Johnston becoming CEO of Endemol Shine UK.

In succeeding years, Endemol's eye and Shine Group's egg logos were replaced with Endemol Shine Group wordmark-only logo in closing credits of most of its-licensed shows, effectively making Endemol and Shine an in-name-only units of that company.

Endemol

Endemol was founded in 1994 by a merger of television production companies owned by Joop van den Ende and John de Mol, the name deriving from the combination of their surnames.

Endemol specialised in formatted programming that can be adapted for different countries around the world as well as different media platforms. One notable success has been the Big Brother reality television show, with versions in many countries after the initial Dutch version. Other examples include Deal or No Deal (sold to over 75 countries), The Money Drop (sold in over 50 countries), Fear Factor (sold in 30 countries) and Wipeout (sold in over 35 countries). In recent years the company has also been expanding its English language drama output with shows such as titles such as The Fall, Peaky Blinders, Ripper Street and Black Mirror in the UK and Hell on Wheels in the USA. In November 2013 the company launched Endemol Beyond, an international division specialising in original content for digital video platforms such as YouTube.

Shine Group

Sale to Banijay
In April 2018, Fox and Apollo appointed Deutsche Bank and Aryeh Bourkoff's LionTree to handle a potential sale of Endemol Shine, following Fox's sale to The Walt Disney Company. William Morris Endeavor and Banijay had eyed an acquisition of Endemol Shine, with Banijay reported to have even entered advanced talks to buy the studio.

On 29 August 2018, the RTL Group (which owns Fremantle) withdrew its bid for Endemol Shine. In September 2018, BBC Studios, along with Discovery, Inc. and Liberty Global (which each own 50% of All3Media) announced that they would not bid on the studio. ITV plc provisionally placed a bid on the studio but did not confirm an official bid as the sale is still only a potential scenario at this point. In October 2018, ITV plc withdrew from the auction. Sony Pictures Entertainment, DHX Media (now WildBrain) and Lionsgate also ruled out of the bidding. ProSiebenSat.1 Media (which owns Red Arrow Studios) was reported to be considered for a joint bid with Banijay, but the latter ruled itself out as well.

Endemol Shine later made a statement that they had been in negotiations with several parties and were confident they would have an owner by end of November 2018. However, on 6 November 2018 it was reported that both Fox and Apollo have decided to suspend the selling process as a deal could not be reached by prospective buyers. In the meantime, Fox's 50% stake in the company was given to Disney. The report was published hours before European Commission's clearance of Disney's impending purchase of Fox on certain conditions.

On 22 October 2019, Banijay officially announced its intent to acquire Endemol Shine from Disney and Apollo for over $2.2 billion. On 26 October 2019, Banijay announced it has entered into a definitive agreement to acquire 100% of the equity of Endemol Shine Group. The merger was approved on 26 October 2019, pending antitrust approval.

In February 2020, Banijay raised $2,600,000,000 in refinancing for acquiring Endemol Shine.

On 30 June 2020, the European Commission approved Banijay's purchase of Endemol Shine. The purchase was completed three days later, and Endemol Shine was folded into Banijay. For a year, Banijay continued to use the Endemol Shine brand for many of its production divisions.

Podcasts
In November 2021, it was announced that Endemol Shine will be moving into podcasting for the first time with a partnership with KT Studios with the aim of developing and co-producing original podcasts.

Companies

Production

Americas
Are the following
Kuarzo Entertainment
Endemol Shine Brasil
Endemol Shine North America
51 Minds: Carryover company from Endemol.
Authentic Entertainment: Carryover company from Endemol.
Endemol Shine Latino
Endemol Shine Boomdog
Truly Original

Europe
Endemol Shine UK
Artists Studio TV Ltd
Bandit Television
Cut & Mustard
Douglas Road Productions Limited
Dragonfly Film and Television Productions Limited
Darlow Smithson Productions Ltd
Electric Robin
Endemol Shine Gaming
Fifty Fathoms
House of Tomorrow
Initial
Kudos: Carryover company from Shine Group.
Kudos North
Vexed Pixie
OP Talent
Remarkable Television
Sharp Jack TV
Shine TV
Shiny Button Productions
Sidney Street
Silent Boom
Simon's Cat Ltd.
Tiger Aspect Productions
Tiger Aspect Drama
Tiger Aspect Kids and Family
Tiger Aspect Comedy
Tigress Productions
Wild Mercury Productions
Workerbee: Carryover company from Shine Group as Shine North. In 2018-11-07, Endemol Shine UK announced renaming Endemol Shine North to Workerbee.
Zeppotron: Formed in 2000 from a core of the writing and production team behind The 11 O'Clock Show.
Definitely: In 2018-09-25, Zeppotron announced the launch of its new label, Definitely.
Endemol Shine Nordics: Carryover company from Shine Group as Shine Nordics AB. The company was formed in 2015 and incorporated and Group companies in Sweden, Norway, Denmark and Finland including Meter Television, STO-CPH Produktion, Filmlance International, Friday TV, Mag5 Content, Rubicon TV, Metronome Spartacus, Metronome Productions, Endemol Sweden and Shine Finland.
Metronome Productions A/S (Denmark)
Endemol Shine Finland
Metronome Spartacus AB (Norway)
Rubicon TV AS  (Norway)
Filmlance International AB (Sweden)
Meter Television AB (Sweden)
Mag5 Content AB (Sweden): Carryover company from Shine Group.
Metronome Post AB (Sweden): Carryover company from Shine Group.
STO-CPH Produktion AB (Sweden): Carryover company from Shine Group.
Endemol Shine Beyond: Carryover company from Endemol as Endemol Beyond. In 2016-04-01, Endemol Shine Beyond announced its renaming to Endemol Shine Beyond.
Endemol Shine France: Carryover company from Shine Group as Shine France.
Endemol Shine Germany: Carryover company from Shine Group as Shine Germany.
MadeFor Film: In 2020-02-25, Endemol Shine Group announced Endemol Shine Germany's new scripted label MadeFor Film.</ref>
Endemol Shine Italy
YAM
Endemol Shine Nederland
Simpel Media
NL Film & TV
TVBV
Human Factor television productions
Endemol Shine Poland (Endemol Shine Polska Sp. z o.o.)
Endemol Shine Iberia: Carryover company from Shine Group as Shine Iberia. In 2015-03-12, Endemol Shine Group announced the launch of Endemol Shine Iberia.
Endemol Portugal
Shine Iberia
Diagonal Television
Gestmusic
Telegenia
Zeppelin Television
Tuiwok Estudios
B&B Endemol Shine (Switzerland)

Middle East
Endemol Shine Israel

Asia Pacific
Endemol Shine Australia: Carryover company from Shine Group as Shine Australia.
Endemol Shine Banks (joint venture with Imogen Banks)
Endemol Shine India
WeiT Media (Russia)
Endemol Shine Asia
Reshet (33%)

Distribution
Endemol Shine International: The sales and distribution branch of the group. It handles the licensing and international distribution of television formats from Endemol Shine to around 150 countries worldwide.

Digital and Gaming
ChannelFlip: Carryover company from Shine Group.
The Multiverse
HuHa!
Good Catch (United Kingdom)

See also
MasterChef India (Telugu TV series)

References

External links

Banijay
Mass media companies established in 2015
Mass media companies disestablished in 2020
Dutch companies established in 2015
Television production companies of the Netherlands
2020 mergers and acquisitions
Former News Corporation subsidiaries
Former subsidiaries of The Walt Disney Company